The Bustamante class was a class of three destroyers of the Spanish Navy. They were built in Spain to a British design completing between 1914 and 1916. They served until 1930–1932. The Bustamante class saw little service, spent mostly in a training squadron and patrolling the coasts of Spain. Compared to contemporary foreign designs, the Bustamante class was considered outclassed, with poor armament and a lack of speed.

Design and description
In 1908, the Spanish Cortes passed a Naval Law that reorganised Spain's naval dockyards to make them more efficient and allowing a modern navy to be built. The law also authorised a large shipbuilding construction programme, with three battleships, three destroyers, 24 torpedo boats and 4 gunboats to be completed by 1914. While the ships were to be built in Spain's newly refurbished shipyards, most of the ships would be of foreign design. The three destroyers were built by Sociedad Española de Construcción Naval (SECN), the consortium set up to refurbish and manage the Spanish shipyards, at Cartagena to a British design (either by Vickers or John Brown — both companies were part of the SECN consortium.).

They were powered by steam turbines, fed by Yarrow or Normand boilers and driving three propeller shafts. Two funnels were fitted. Armament consisted of five Vickers  guns, two side-by-side on the ships' forecastle, one aft on the ships' centreline, and the remaining two guns on the ships' beam. Two sets of twin  torpedo tubes were fitted.

Construction and service
The three destroyers, Bustamante, Villaamil and Cadarso were laid down between 1911 and 1913. Bustamante and Villaamil were launched in 1913 while Cadarso was launched in 1914. Bustamante was completed in 1914, with Villaamil and Cadarso completing in 1916. Owing to the cessation of material support from Great Britain during the First World War Cadarso was fitted with  torpedo tubes instead of the planned 450 mm tubes. By the time they entered service, the Bustamante class were outclassed by contemporary foreign destroyers, being poorly armed and slow.

The ships carried out neutrality patrols around Spain's coasts during the First World War. They spent much of their time in a training squadron, and were disposed of in the early 1930s, with Cadarso being scrapped in 1930, Bustamante in 1931 and Villaamil in 1932.

Citations

References
 
 
 

 
Destroyer classes
Destroyers of Spain